Dobré Pole is a municipality and village in Břeclav District in the South Moravian Region of the Czech Republic. It has about 500 inhabitants.

Demography
Dobré Pole is one of South Moravian villages with historical Moravian Croat population.

References

External links

 

Villages in Břeclav District
Croatian communities in the Czech Republic